Lasara is a village in Phillaur tehsil of Jalandhar District of Punjab State, India. It is located 17 km away from Phillaur, 60 km from Jalandhar and 108 km from state capital Chandigarh. The village is administrated by a Sarpanch, an elected representative of the village.

Demographics 
As of 2011, the village has a population size of 4502. The village has schedule caste (SC) constitutes 26.70% of total population of the village and it doesn't have any Schedule Tribe (ST) population.

Education 
The village has a co-ed upper Primary with secondary/higher secondary school which was founded in 1965. It provides a mid-day meal as per the Indian Midday Meal Scheme.

Transport

Rail 
Phillaur Junction is the nearest train station which is 17 km away from the village, however, Bhattian Railway Station is 20 km away from the village.

Air 
The nearest domestic airport is located 42.4 km away in Ludhiana and the nearest international airport is located in Chandigarh. The second nearest international airport is 155 km away in Amritsar.

References 

Villages in Jalandhar district
Villages in Phillaur tehsil